Needless is an anime series adapted from Kami Imai manga series of the same name. Produced by Madhouse and directed by Masayuki Sakoi, the series was broadcast on Tokyo MX from July 2, 2009 to December 10, 2009 for 24 episodes. The opening theme is "Modern Strange Cowboy" by GRANRODEO and the ending is "Aggressive Zone" by Needless★Girls, composed of the voice actresses of the series, Aya Endo, Eri Kitamura, Emiri Katō, Saori Gotō and Yui Makino. The second opening is "Scarlet Bomb!" by Aki Misato and the second ending is "WANTED! for the love" by Needless★Girls.

North American anime distributor Section23 Films announced that Sentai Filmworks has licensed the series and would release the series. The first complete set was shipped on Blu-ray and DVD February 11, 2011. The second complete set was released on April 12, 2011.

Episode list

References

Needless